Brian Gill may refer to:

 Brian Gill (cricketer) (born 1948), New Zealand cricketer
 Brian Gill (rugby league), English rugby league footballer
 Brian Gill (zoologist) (born 1953), former curator at Auckland Museum
 Brian Gill, Lord Gill (born 1942), Lord President and Lord Justice General and Scotland's longest serving judge